The Horáček's horseshoe bat (Rhinolophus horaceki) is a species of bat in the family Rhinolophidae, which is endemic to Cyrenaica, Libya.

References

Rhinolophidae
Mammals described in 2012
Bats of Africa